Shekki may refer to:

 Shekki, a former Chinese city in Guangdong Province, now the Shiqi Subdistrict of Zhongshan
 Shaki, Azerbaijan
 Finnish for cheque